Sander Eitrem (born 12 February 2002) is a Norwegian allround speed skater.

In February 2022 he competed in the 2022 World Allround Speed Skating Championships which were held at the Vikingskipet in Hamar, Norway and finished in fifth position in the overall standings. 

Eitrem won the 5000m event at the 2023 European Speed Skating Championships and finished second in the overall standings behind reigning European champion Patrick Roest.

Personal records

He is currently in 22nd position in the adelskalender with 147.366 points.

References

External links
 
 
 

2002 births
Living people
Norwegian male speed skaters
21st-century Norwegian people
Speed skaters at the 2020 Winter Youth Olympics